Chloroethane, commonly known as ethyl chloride, is a chemical compound with chemical formula CH3CH2Cl, once widely used in producing tetraethyllead, a gasoline additive. It is a colorless, flammable gas or refrigerated liquid with a faintly sweet odor.

Ethyl chloride was first synthesised by Valentine by reacting ethanol and hydrochloric acid in 1440. Glauber made it in 1648 by reacting ethanol and zinc chloride.

Production
Chloroethane is produced by hydrochlorination of ethylene:
C2H4 + HCl → C2H5Cl

At various times in the past, chloroethane has also been produced from ethanol and hydrochloric acid, from ethane and chlorine, or from ethanol and phosphorus trichloride, but these routes are no longer economical. Some chloroethane is generated as a byproduct of polyvinyl chloride production.

Uses
Chloroethane is an inexpensive ethylating agent. It reacts with aluminium metal to give ethylaluminium sesquichloride, a precursor to polymers and other useful organoaluminium compounds. Chloroethane is used to convert cellulose to ethylcellulose, a thickening agent and binder in paints, cosmetics, and similar products.

Like other chlorinated hydrocarbons, chloroethane has been used as a refrigerant, an aerosol spray propellant, an anesthetic, and a blowing agent for foam packaging. For a time it was used as a promoter chemical in the aluminium chloride catalyzed process to produce ethylbenzene, the precursor for styrene monomer. At present though, it is not widely used in any of these roles.

Obsolete uses
Beginning in 1922 and continuing through most of the 20th century, the major use of chloroethane was to produce tetraethyllead (TEL), an anti-knock additive for gasoline. TEL has been or is being phased out in most of the industrialized world, and the demand for chloroethane has fallen sharply.

Niche uses
It acts as a mild topical anesthetic by its chilling effect when sprayed on skin, such as when removing splinters or incising abscesses in a clinical setting. It was standard equipment in “casualty” wards. It was commonly used to induce general anaesthesia before continuing with di-ethyl ether, which had a very much slower up-take.

The heat absorbed by the boiling liquid on tissues produces a deep and rapid chill. 

In dentistry, chloroethane is used as one of the means of diagnosing a 'dead tooth', i.e. one in which the pulp has died. A small amount of the substance is placed on the suspect tooth using a cotton wad. Chloroethane's low boiling point creates a localised chilling effect. If the tooth is still alive this should be sensed by the patient as mild discomfort that subsides when the wad is removed.

Recreational drug
Chloroethane is a recreational inhalant drug, although it should not be confused with a duster or canned air, which is composed of fluorinated low-weight hydrocarbons such as tetrafluoromethane, chlorodifluoromethane or another similar gas.

In Brazil, it is a major component of a traditional (though illegal) drug taken during Carnaval, known locally as "lança-perfume" (lit. perfume launcher or sprayer).

Safety
The vapor is flammable and narcotic, which requires care.

Monochloroethane is the least toxic of the chloroethanes. Like other chlorinated hydrocarbons, it is a central nervous system depressant, albeit a less potent one than many similar compounds. People breathing its vapors at less than 1% concentration in air usually experience no symptoms. At concentrations of 3% to 5%, victims usually exhibit symptoms similar to those of alcohol intoxication. Breathing its vapors at >15% concentration is often fatal but most commercially available handheld containers contain a total of 30% per volume of concentrated vapors which naturally disperse in the outside air.

If exposed to concentrations higher than 6% to 8% victims often exhibit shallow breathing, loss of consciousnesses, and depressed heart-rate. They can be aroused (brought around) with physical contact or loud noise. At this point removal from the area of exposure is advised to restore consciousness. The long-term effects of exposure over a period of 4 or more hours will cause side effects similar to alcoholic hang-over with dehydration, dizziness, loss of clear vision and temporary loss of consciousness, which can last an hour or more. If no longer exposed to the gas, a victim will return to normal health quickly. This can be helped with intake of extra fluids, vitamins, and sugars.

Toxic over-exposure starts at 9% to 12% concentrations, the heart rate drops further, the victim may have more shallow breathing or stop all together, they do not respond to any outside stimulation and may begin to involuntarily gasp, belch or vomit, which can lead to aspiration if the victim is not turned on their side. This constitutes a medical emergency and requires prompt action. It is advised to move the victim to clear air and administer forced breathing for them to purge the lungs of the toxic fumes. If the victim recovers quickly enough, hospitalization may not be required, but will require a medical examination to ensure that no organ damage has occurred.

At >12% concentration, the victim's heart, lungs and kidneys begin to fail. Immediate CPR followed by medical support measures may be required to prevent fatal kidney, lung and heart failure. Singer Darius Campbell Danesh died of "toxic effects of chloroethane" as well as suffocation.

Studies on the effects of chronic ethyl chloride exposure in animals have given inconsistent results, and no data exists for its long-term effects on humans. Some studies have reported that prolonged exposure can produce liver or kidney damage, or uterine cancer in mice, but these data have been difficult to reproduce.

While chloroethane is not classified as to carcinogenicity to humans specifically, recent information suggests carcinogenic potential and it has been designated as ACGIH category A3, Confirmed Animal Carcinogen with Unknown Relevance to Humans. As a result, the U.S. State of California has incorporated it into Proposition 65 as a known carcinogen. Nonetheless, it is still used in medicine as a local anesthetic.

References

External links

IARC Monograph "Chloroethane."

National Pollutant Inventory - Chloroethane

Chloroalkanes
Local anesthetics
General anesthetics
Hazardous air pollutants
IARC Group 3 carcinogens
GABAA receptor positive allosteric modulators
Muscle relaxants
Inhalants
Sweet-smelling chemicals